P. N. Sathya (died 5 May 2018) was an Indian film director, writer and actor working in Kannada cinema. He was known for writing and directing crime drama films. He debuted with the crime film Majestic (2002) which introduced actor Darshan in the lead role and went on to direct many such films like Don (2003), Daasa (2003), Shashtri (2005), Thangigagi (2006), Sugreeva (2010) and Shivajinagara (2014). He has also acted in 21 films.

Filmography

As director

As actor

References

External links
 
 P N Sathya biography

20th-century births
2018 deaths
Year of birth missing
Male actors in Kannada cinema
Indian male film actors
Kannada film directors
Kannada screenwriters
21st-century Indian male actors
21st-century Indian film directors
Film directors from Karnataka
Screenwriters from Karnataka